Baron Janner or Lord Janner may refer to two people, both of whom were British Members of Parliament elevated to the peerage after their retirement from the House of Commons:

Barnett Janner, Baron Janner (1892–1982), Liberal Member of Parliament (MP) 1931–1935, Labour MP 1945–1970
Greville Janner, Baron Janner of Braunstone (1928–2015), his son, Labour MP 1970–1997